Sergei Viktorovich Soin (born March 31, 1982) is a Russian former professional  ice hockey forward who played in the Kontinental Hockey League (KHL).

Playing career
Soin began playing professionally as a 16-year old with Krylya Sovetov Moscow of the Russian Superleague in the 1998-99 season. Showing early promise as a prospect, Soin was selected in the second round, 50th overall, by the Colorado Avalanche in the 2000 NHL Entry Draft.

Soin formerly joined HC Dynamo Moscow on a two-year contract from the Severstal Cherepovets on May 16, 2011. After four seasons with Dynamo Moscow, Soin left the club to sign a two-year contract with Salavat Yulaev Ufa on May 28, 2015.

Career statistics

Regular season and playoffs

International

References

External links

1982 births
Living people
Colorado Avalanche draft picks
HC CSKA Moscow players
HC Dynamo Moscow players
Ice hockey people from Moscow
Krylya Sovetov Moscow players
HC Lada Togliatti players
Russian ice hockey centres
Salavat Yulaev Ufa players
Severstal Cherepovets players